Chinaqucha (Quechua china female, qucha lake, "female lake", also spelled Chinacocha) is a lake in the Arequipa Region in Peru. It is located in the Arequipa Province, Tarucani District. Chinaqucha lies northwest of Urququcha and the mountain named Suri Wasi.

References 

Lakes of Peru
Lakes of Arequipa Region